The Macchi M.C.94 was a 1930s Italian commercial flying boat built by Macchi.

Development
The M.C.94 was designed by Mario Castoldi as a commercial passenger transport flying boat to replace the Ala Littoria airlines  elderly CANT 10s. Constructed mainly of wood, it was a high-wing cantilever monoplane with a two-step hull and single fin and rudder. The prototype, which was an amphibian with a retractable wheeled undercarriage which swung forward into streamlined casings in the leading edges of the wings, was powered by two  Wright SGR-1820-F Cyclone nine-cylinder air-cooled radial engines mounted above the wing, each driving a tractor propeller. It was followed by 11 production aircraft, which were all pure flying boats. From the seventh aircraft,  Alfa Romeo 126 R.C.10 radial engines were fitted. The three-man crew was accommodated in a raised and enclosed cockpit and the main cabin could accommodate 12 passengers.

Ala Littoria purchased the prototype and first five production aircraft in 1936. The Regia Aeronautica (Italian Royal Air Force) declined purchase of the final six production aircraft,  which Ala Littoria then also bought.

Operational history
The M.C.94 entered service with Ala Littoria in 1936 on Adriatic routes, and a number were still in service during World War II. In 1939, Ala Italia sold three of its M.C.94s to its Argentinian partner, Corporación Sudamericana de Servicios Aéreos.

Variants
M.C.94 Anfibio 
Prototype amphibian version with Wright engines.
M.C.94 
The first five production aircraft built as pure flying boats with Wright engines.
M.C.94
The final six production aircraft, also built as flying boats with Alfa Romeo 126 R.C.10 engines.

Operators

Corporación Sudamericana de Servicios Aéreos
A.L.F.A. (Aviación del Litoral Fluvial Argentino)

Ala Littoria
Regia Aeronautica

Specifications (MC.94)

See also

Notes

References

 
 

M.C.094
1930s Italian airliners
Flying boats
High-wing aircraft
Aircraft first flown in 1935
Twin piston-engined tractor aircraft